Nightmare is a 1964 British horror film directed by Freddie Francis and starring Jennie Linden. It was written by Jimmy Sangster, who also produced the film for Hammer Films. The film focuses on a young girl in a finishing school who is plagued by nightmares concerning her institutionalized mother.

Plot
Janet, a girl at finishing school who six years earlier saw her mother stab her father to death, is plagued by nightmares. (Her mother, following the tragedy, was committed to an asylum.) Miss Lewis, a teacher, takes Janet home and in the absence of Henry Baxter, Janet's guardian, they are met by John, the chauffeur; Mrs. Gibbs, the housekeeper; and Grace Maddox, an attractive nurse-companion hired by Henry. Miss Lewis leaves Janet in Grace's care.

The nightmares continue: a white-shrouded woman roams the corridors, inviting Janet to burst into her parents' room, where she finds the same woman on the bed with a knife in her chest. When Henry returns, he finds Janet under sedation; her doctors recommend psychiatric care but he refuses and Janet tries to commit suicide.

Henry's wife comes to tea and, because she seems to be the woman in Janet's nightmares, Janet stabs the woman to death and is promptly committed to an institution. The woman in white is revealed to be Grace, disguised with a wig and mask and conspiring with Henry. They marry, but Grace begins believing that Henry is trying to drive her mad. Under the impression that Janet has escaped from the asylum, Grace stabs Henry to death, expecting Janet to be blamed. Janet, however, never left the asylum and Grace is brought to justice.

Cast 
David Knight as Henry Baxter
Moira Redmond as Grace Maddox
Jennie Linden as Janet
Brenda Bruce as Mary Lewis
George A. Cooper as John
Clytie Jessop as Woman in White
Irene Richmond as Mrs. Gibbs 
John Welsh as Doctor
Timothy Bateson as Barman

Production
Jennie Linden was an 11th hour casting choice replacing Julie Christie who dropped out to do the film Billy Liar. The film was shot with the working title Here's the Knife Dear:  Now Use It.

Release
Nightmare had its public premiere at the New Victoria Theatre in London on 19 April 1964. It received a general release in the United Kingdom on 31 May 1964 by Rank Film Distributors in support of The Evil of Frankenstein.

In the United States, the film received a DVD release through Universal Pictures in an eight-film set titled The Hammer Horror Series on 6 September 2005. This set was re-released on Blu-ray on 13 September 2016.

The film was released on 28 November 2016 in the United Kingdom on a Region B Blu-ray disc.

On 28 June 2021 Nightmare was released in Europe as part of Powerhouse Films' Hammer Volume Six: Night Shadows limited edition Blu-ray box set.

Reception 

In a contemporary review, the Monthly Film Bulletin described the film as a "quasi-Diaboliques" and stated that it "evidently proved an increasing burden of late for the writer, Jimmy Sangster, in his efforts to find even the slightest variations." It described the film as "predictable."

AllMovie called the film an "effective little chiller that packs a surprising punch for a film of its age."

References

Bibliography

External links 
Nightmare at the British Film Institute
 

1964 films
1964 horror films
1960s mystery films
1960s psychological thriller films
Films directed by Freddie Francis
Hammer Film Productions horror films
Films about nightmares
Films with screenplays by Jimmy Sangster
Films produced by Jimmy Sangster
1960s English-language films
1960s British films